Såner Station was a railway station on the Østfold Line in Norway. It was located between Hølen and Sonsveien Station in the Såner village in the Municipality of Vestby. Designed by Peter A. Blix in Swiss chalet style, it was opened on 2 January 1879. The station was closed on 21 September 1996, when the section between Rustad and Kambo Station was upgraded to double tracks.

History
The western branch of the Østfold Line opened on 2 January 1879 while the eastern branch opened on 24 November 1882. Såner Station was located on the western branch, and was originally named "Soner", but had its name changed to "Saaner" in April 1894. In April 1921, it had its name changed to "Såner". On 15 May 1893, it was decided to install a morse lamp at the station. Centralized semaphores were decided on 23 January 1900, as an experiment to gain knowledge of the system.

The station became unmanned on 1 January 1973 and was closed on 21 June 1996.

Facilities and location
The facilities of Såner Station were designed by Peter A. Blix in Swiss chalet style. The head house featured two storeys and a basement, which together constituted  of ground area. An outhouse and a timber shed were also located at the station. The Såner Church is located east of the station. It burned down in 1995 and was reerected in 2000.

References

Railway stations in Akershus
Railway stations on the Østfold Line
Railway stations opened in 1879
Railway stations closed in 1996
Disused railway stations in Norway
1879 establishments in Norway
1996 disestablishments in Norway